Pseudochodaeus is a genus of sand-loving scarab beetles in the family Ochodaeidae. There is at least one described species in Pseudochodaeus, P. estriatus.

References

Further reading

 
 

scarabaeiformia
Articles created by Qbugbot